Willem Louw (born 21 October 1980) is a South African cricketer. He played in seven first-class and eight List A matches for Boland in 2005 and 2006.

See also
 List of Boland representative cricketers

References

External links
 

1980 births
Living people
South African cricketers
Boland cricketers
Cricketers from Johannesburg